Scottish council may refer to:

 Scottish Arts Council, a Scottish public body
 Scottish council, a form of local government in Scotland
 Scottish Council for Development and Industry, a non-governmental, membership organisation which aims to strengthen Scotland’s economic competitiveness
 Scottish Council for Voluntary Organisations, the national body representing the voluntary sector in Scotland
 Scottish Funding Council, the body in Scotland that distributes funding from the Scottish Executive to the country's colleges and universities
 Scottish Refugee Council, a charity
 Scottish Council of the Labour Party, the name of the Scottish Labour Party from 1900 to 1994